MENA REPORT (Middle East and North Africa Business Report), also known as MENAFN (Middle East and North Africa Financial Network) is a business news agency established in 2001 and run by Al Bawaba (Amman, Jordan, and Dubai). It covers business and economics across the Arab world.

Profile
The Mena Report was established in 2001. It covers economy and trade, IT and telecom, financial markets, oil and energy, agriculture, general industry, retail and services, transport and tourism. At time of launch, Menafn.com and Zawya.com provided similar content as  the Mena Report. Al Bawaba employs journalists and editors to cover news and events in the Middle East and North Africa. The content is presented on Al Bawaba's own website, and is syndicated to other publishers and aggregators. In 2009 the Mena Report portal claimed to have 123,409 monthly site visits.

References

2001 establishments in Jordan
Arabic-language websites
Business magazines
English-language websites
Magazines published in Jordan
Jordanian news websites
Internet properties established in 2001
Magazines established in 2001